Koshino may refer to:

 Koshino, Fukui, a village in Japan
 Michiko Koshino, a Japanese fashion designer